Alan Wilson Watts (6 January 1915 – 16 November 1973) was an English writer, speaker and self-styled "philosophical entertainer", known for interpreting and popularising Japanese, Chinese and Indian traditions of Buddhist, Taoist, and Hindu philosophy for a Western audience. Born in Chislehurst, England, he moved to the United States in 1938 and began Zen training in New York. He received a master's degree in theology from Seabury-Western Theological Seminary and became an Episcopal priest in 1945. He left the ministry in 1950 and moved to California, where he joined the faculty of the American Academy of Asian Studies.

Watts gained a following while working as a volunteer programmer at the KPFA radio station in Berkeley. He wrote more than 25 books and articles on religion and philosophy, introducing the emerging hippie counter culture to The Way of Zen (1957), one of the first best selling books on Buddhism. In Psychotherapy East and West (1961), he argued that Buddhism could be thought of as a form of psychotherapy. He considered Nature, Man and Woman (1958) to be, "from a literary point of view—the best book I have ever written". He also explored human consciousness and psychedelics in works such as "The New Alchemy" (1958) and The Joyous Cosmology (1962).

After Watts' death, his lectures found posthumous popularity through regular broadcasts on public radio, especially in California and New York, and more recently on the internet, on sites and apps such as YouTube and Spotify. The bulk of his recorded audio talks were recorded during the 1960s and early 1970s.

Early years

Watts was born to middle-class parents in the village of Chislehurst, Kent (now south-east London), on 6 January 1915, living at Rowan Tree Cottage, 3 (now 5) Holbrook Lane. Watts's father, Laurence Wilson Watts, was a representative for the London office of the Michelin tyre company. His mother, Emily Mary Watts (née Buchan), was a housewife whose father had been a missionary. With modest financial means, they chose to live in pastoral surroundings, and Watts, an only child, grew up playing at Brookside, learning the names of wild flowers and butterflies. Probably because of the influence of his mother's religious family the Buchans, an interest in "ultimate things" seeped in. It mixed with Watts's own interests in storybook fables and romantic tales of the mysterious Far East.

Watts also later wrote of a mystical dream he experienced while ill with a fever as a child. During this time he was influenced by Far Eastern landscape paintings and embroideries that had been given to his mother by missionaries returning from China. The few Chinese paintings Watts was able to see in England riveted him, and he wrote "I was aesthetically fascinated with a certain clarity, transparency, and spaciousness in Chinese and Japanese art. It seemed to float..." These works of art emphasised the participatory relationship of people in nature, a theme that stood fast throughout his life and one that he often wrote about. (See, for instance, the last chapter in The Way of Zen.)

Buddhism

By his own assessment, Watts was imaginative, headstrong, and talkative. He was sent to boarding schools (which included both academic and religious training of the "Muscular Christian" sort) from early years. Of this religious training, he remarked "Throughout my schooling, my religious indoctrination was grim and maudlin."

Watts spent several holidays in France in his teen years, accompanied by Francis Croshaw, a wealthy Epicurean with strong interests in both Buddhism and exotic little-known aspects of European culture. It was not long afterward that Watts felt forced to decide between the Anglican Christianity he had been exposed to and the Buddhism he had read about in various libraries, including Croshaw's. He chose Buddhism, and sought membership in the London Buddhist Lodge, which was then run by the barrister and QC Christmas Humphreys, (who later became a judge at the Old Bailey). Watts became the organization's secretary at 16 (1931). The young Watts explored several styles of meditation during these years.

Education

Watts attended The King's School, Canterbury, in the grounds of Canterbury Cathedral. Though he was frequently at the top of his classes scholastically and was given responsibilities at school, he botched an opportunity for a scholarship to Oxford by styling a crucial examination essay in a way that was read as "presumptuous and capricious".

When he left King's, Watts worked in a printing house and later a bank. He spent his spare time involved with the Buddhist Lodge and also under the tutelage of a "rascal guru" named Dimitrije Mitrinović. (Mitrinović was himself influenced by Peter Demianovich Ouspensky, G. I. Gurdjieff, and the varied psychoanalytical schools of Freud, Jung and Adler.) Watts also read widely in philosophy, history, psychology, psychiatry, and Eastern wisdom.

By his own reckoning, and also by that of his biographer Monica Furlong, Watts was primarily an autodidact. His involvement with the Buddhist Lodge in London afforded Watts a considerable number of opportunities for personal growth. Through Humphreys, he contacted eminent spiritual authors, e.g. the artist, scholar, and mystic Nicholas Roerich, Sarvapalli Radhakrishnan, and prominent theosophists like Alice Bailey.

In 1936, aged 21, he attended the World Congress of Faiths at the University of London, where he met the esteemed scholar of Zen Buddhism, D. T. Suzuki, who was there presenting a paper. Beyond attending discussions, Watts studied the available scholarly literature, learning the fundamental concepts and terminology of Indian and East Asian philosophy.

Influences and first publication
Watts's fascination with the Zen (or Ch'an) tradition—beginning during the 1930s—developed because that tradition embodied the spiritual, interwoven with the practical, as exemplified in the subtitle of his Spirit of Zen: A Way of Life, Work, and Art in the Far East. "Work", "life", and "art" were not demoted due to a spiritual focus. In his writing, he referred to it as "the great Ch'an (or Zen) synthesis of Taoism, Confucianism and Buddhism after AD 700 in China." Watts published his first book, The Spirit of Zen, in 1936. Two decades later, in The Way of Zen he disparaged The Spirit of Zen as a "popularisation of Suzuki's earlier works, and besides being very unscholarly it is in many respects out of date and misleading."

Watts married Eleanor Everett, whose mother Ruth Fuller Everett was involved with a traditional Zen Buddhist circle in New York. Ruth Fuller later married the Zen master (or "roshi"), Sokei-an Sasaki, who served as a sort of model and mentor to Watts, though he chose not to enter into a formal Zen training relationship with Sasaki. During these years, according to his later writings, Watts had another mystical experience while on a walk with his wife. In 1938 they left England to live in the United States. Watts became a United States citizen in 1943.

Christian priest and afterwards
Watts left formal Zen training in New York because the method of the teacher did not suit him. He was not ordained as a Zen monk, but he felt a need to find a vocational outlet for his philosophical inclinations. He entered Seabury-Western Theological Seminary, an Episcopal (Anglican) school in Evanston, Illinois, where he studied Christian scriptures, theology, and church history. He attempted to work out a blend of contemporary Christian worship, mystical Christianity, and Asian philosophy. Watts was awarded a master's degree in theology in response to his thesis, which he published as a popular edition under the title Behold the Spirit: A Study in the Necessity of Mystical Religion.

He later published Myth & Ritual in Christianity (1953), an eisegesis of traditional Roman Catholic doctrine and ritual in Buddhist terms. However, the pattern was set, in that Watts did not hide his dislike for religious outlooks that he decided were dour, guilt-ridden, or militantly proselytizing—no matter if they were found within Judaism, Christianity, Islam, Hinduism, or Buddhism.

In early 1951, Watts moved to California, where he joined the faculty of the American Academy of Asian Studies in San Francisco. Here he taught from 1951 to 1957 alongside Saburo Hasegawa (1906–1957), Frederic Spiegelberg, Haridas Chaudhuri, lama Tada Tōkan (1890–1967), and various visiting experts and professors. Hasegawa, in particular, served as a teacher to Watts in the areas of Japanese customs, arts, primitivism, and perceptions of nature. It was during this time he met the poet Jean Burden, with whom he had a four-year love affair.

Alan credited Burden as an "important influence" in his life and gave her dedicatory cryptograph in his book Nature, Man and Woman, to which he alludes in his autobiography (p. 297). Besides teaching, Watts served for several years as the Academy's administrator. One notable student of his was Eugene Rose, who later went on to become a noted Eastern Orthodox Christian hieromonk and controversial theologian within the Orthodox Church in America under the jurisdiction of ROCOR. Rose's own disciple, a fellow monastic priest published under the name Hieromonk Damascene, produced a book entitled Christ the Eternal Tao, in which the author draws parallels between the concept of the Tao in Chinese philosophy and the concept of the Logos in classical Greek philosophy and Eastern Christian theology.

Watts also studied written Chinese and practised Chinese brush calligraphy with Hasegawa as well as with Hodo Tobase, who gave classes for a period in the Academy's kitchen, which were also attended by Gordon Onslow Ford. While Watts was noted for an interest in Zen Buddhism, his reading and discussions delved into Vedanta, "the new physics", cybernetics, semantics, process philosophy, natural history, and the anthropology of sexuality.

Middle years
Watts left the faculty in the mid-1950s. In 1953, he began what became a long-running weekly radio program at Pacifica Radio station KPFA in Berkeley. Like other volunteer programmers at the listener-sponsored station, Watts was not paid for his broadcasts. These weekly broadcasts continued until 1962, by which time he had attracted a "legion of regular listeners".

Watts continued to give numerous talks and seminars, recordings of which were broadcast on KPFA and other radio stations during his life. These recordings are broadcast to this day. For example, in 1970 Watts lectures were broadcast on Sunday mornings on San Francisco radio station KSAN; and even today a number of radio stations continue to have an Alan Watts program in their weekly program schedules. Original tapes of his broadcasts and talks are currently held by the Pacifica Radio Archives, based at KPFK in Los Angeles, and at the Electronic University archive founded by his son, Mark Watts.

In 1957 Watts, then 42, published one of his best-known books, The Way of Zen, which focused on philosophical explication and history. Besides drawing on the lifestyle and philosophical background of Zen in India and China, Watts introduced ideas drawn from general semantics (directly from the writings of Alfred Korzybski) and also from Norbert Wiener's early work on cybernetics, which had recently been published. Watts offered analogies from cybernetic principles possibly applicable to the Zen life. The book sold well, eventually becoming a modern classic, and helped widen his lecture circuit.

In 1958, Watts toured parts of Europe with his father, meeting the Swiss psychiatrist Carl Jung and the German psychotherapist Karlfried Graf Dürckheim.

Upon returning to the United States, Watts recorded two seasons of a television series (1959–1960) for KQED public television in San Francisco, "Eastern Wisdom and Modern Life".

In the 1960s, Watts became interested in how identifiable patterns in nature tend to repeat themselves from the smallest of scales to the most immense. This became one of his passions in his research and thought.

Though never affiliated for long with any one academic institution, he was Professor of Comparative Philosophy at the American Academy of Asian Studies (as mentioned above), had a fellowship at Harvard University (1962–1964), and was a Scholar at San Jose State University (1968). He lectured college and university students as well as the general public. His lectures and books gave him influence on the American intelligentsia of the 1950s–1970s, but he was often seen as an outsider in academia. When questioned sharply by students during his talk at University of California, Santa Cruz, in 1970, Watts responded, as he had from the early sixties, that he was not an academic philosopher but rather "a philosophical entertainer".

Experimentation

Some of Watts's writings published in 1958 (e.g., his book Nature, Man and Woman and his essay "The New Alchemy") mentioned some of his early views on the use of psychedelic drugs for mystical insight. Watts had begun to experiment with psychedelics, initially with mescaline given to him by Oscar Janiger. He tried LSD several times in 1958, with various research teams led by Keith S. Ditman, Sterling Bunnell Jr., and Michael Agron. He also tried marijuana and concluded that it was a useful and interesting psychoactive drug that gave the impression of time slowing down. Watts's books of the '60s reveal the influence of these chemical adventures on his outlook.

He later said about psychedelic drug use, "If you get the message, hang up the phone. For psychedelic drugs are simply instruments, like microscopes, telescopes, and telephones. The biologist does not sit with eye permanently glued to the microscope, he goes away and works on what he has seen."

Applied aesthetics

Watts sometimes ate with his group of neighbours in Druid Heights (near Mill Valley, California) who had endeavoured to combine architecture, gardening, and carpentry skills to make a beautiful and comfortable life for themselves. These neighbours accomplished this by relying on their own talents and using their own hands, as they lived in what has been called "shared bohemian poverty". Druid Heights was founded by the writer Elsa Gidlow, and Watts dedicated his book The Joyous Cosmology to the people of this neighbourhood. He later dedicated his autobiography to Elsa Gidlow, for whom he held a great affection.

Regarding his intentions, Watts attempted to lessen the alienation that accompanies the experience of being human that he felt plagued the modern Westerner, and (like his fellow British expatriate and friend, Aldous Huxley) to lessen the ill will that was an unintentional by-product of alienation from the natural world. He felt such teaching could improve the world, at least to a degree. He also articulated the possibilities for greater incorporation of aesthetics (for example: better architecture, more art, more fine cuisine) in American life. In his autobiography he wrote, "… cultural renewal comes about when highly differentiated cultures mix".

In his last novel, Island (1962), Huxley mentions the religious practice of maithuna as being something like that which Roman Catholics call "coitus reservatus". A few years before, Watts had discussed the theme in his own book, Nature, Man and Woman, in which he discusses the possibility of the practice being known to early Christians and of it being kept secretly by the Church.

Later years
In his writings of the 1950s, he conveyed his admiration for the practicality in the historical achievements of Chán (Zen) in the Far East, for it had fostered farmers, architects, builders, folk physicians, artists, and administrators among the monks who had lived in the monasteries of its lineages. In his mature work, he presents himself as "Zennist" in spirit as he wrote in his last book, Tao: The Watercourse Way. Child rearing, the arts, cuisine, education, law and freedom, architecture, sexuality, and the uses and abuses of technology were all of great interest to him.

Though known for his discourses on Zen, he was also influenced by ancient Hindu scriptures, especially Vedanta and Yoga. He spoke extensively about the nature of the divine reality which Man misses: how the contradiction of opposites is the method of life and the means of cosmic and human evolution, how our fundamental Ignorance is rooted in the exclusive nature of mind and ego, how to come in touch with the Field of Consciousness and Light, and other cosmic principles.

Watts sought to resolve his feelings of alienation from the institutions of marriage and the values of American society, as revealed in his comments on love relationships in "Divine Madness" and on perception of the organism-environment in "The Philosophy of Nature". In looking at social issues he was concerned with the necessity for international peace, for tolerance, and understanding among disparate cultures.

Watts also came to feel acutely conscious of a growing ecological predicament. Writing, for example, in the early 1960s: "Can any melting or burning imaginable get rid of these ever-rising mountains of ruin—especially when the things we make and build are beginning to look more and more like rubbish even before they are thrown away?" These concerns were later expressed in a television pilot, Conversation with Myself, made for NET (National Educational Television) filmed at his mountain retreat in 1971 in which he noted that the single track of conscious attention was wholly inadequate for interactions with a multi-tracked world.

Death and legacy

In October 1973, Watts returned from a European lecture tour to his cabin in Druid Heights, California. Friends of Watts had been concerned about him for some time over his alcoholism. On 16 November 1973, at age 58, he died in the Mandala House in Druid Heights. He was reported to have been under treatment for a heart condition. Before authorities could attend, his body was removed from his home and cremated on a wood pyre at a nearby beach by Buddhist monks. Mark Watts relates that Watts was cremated on Muir Beach at 8:30am after being discovered deceased at 6:00am.

His ashes were split, with half buried near his library at Druid Heights and half at the Green Gulch Monastery.

His son, Mark Watts, investigated his death and found that his father had planned his own passing meticulously:

His wife, Mary Jane Watts, wrote later in a letter that Watts had said to her "The secret of life is knowing when to stop".

A personal account of Watts's last years and approach to death is given by Al Chung-liang Huang in Tao: The Watercourse Way.

Views

On spiritual and social identity

Regarding his ethical outlook, Watts felt that absolute morality had nothing to do with the fundamental realization of one's deep spiritual identity. He advocated social rather than personal ethics. In his writings, Watts was increasingly concerned with ethics applied to relations between humanity and the natural environment and between governments and citizens. He wrote out of an appreciation of a racially and culturally diverse social landscape.

He often said that he wished to act as a bridge between the ancient and the modern, between East and West, and between culture and nature.

Watts led some tours for Westerners to the Buddhist temples of Japan. He also studied some movements from the traditional Chinese martial art taijiquan, with an Asian colleague, Al Chung-liang Huang.

Worldview

In several of his later publications, especially Beyond Theology and The Book: On the Taboo Against Knowing Who You Are, Watts put forward a worldview, drawing on Hinduism, Chinese philosophy, pantheism or panentheism, and modern science, in which he maintains that the whole universe consists of a cosmic Self-playing hide-and-seek (Lila); hiding from itself (Maya) by becoming all the living and non-living things in the universe and forgetting what it really is – the upshot being that we are all IT in disguise (Tat Tvam Asi). In this worldview, Watts asserts that our conception of ourselves as an "ego in a bag of skin", or "skin-encapsulated ego" is a myth; the entities we call the separate "things" are merely aspects or features of the whole.

Watts's books frequently include discussions reflecting his keen interest in patterns that occur in nature and which are repeated in various ways and at a wide range of scales – including the patterns to be discerned in the history of civilizations.

Supporters and critics

Watts' explorations and teaching brought him into contact with many noted intellectuals, artists, and American teachers in the human potential movement. His friendship with poet Gary Snyder nurtured his sympathies with the budding environmental movement, to which Watts gave philosophical support. He also encountered Robert Anton Wilson, who credited Watts with being one of his "Light[s] along the Way" in the opening appreciation of his 1977 book Cosmic Trigger: The Final Secret of the Illuminati. Werner Erhard attended workshops given by Alan Watts and said of him, "He pointed me toward what I now call the distinction between Self and Mind. After my encounter with Alan, the context in which I was working shifted."

Watts has been criticized by Buddhists such as Philip Kapleau and D. T. Suzuki for allegedly misinterpreting several key Zen Buddhist concepts. In particular, he drew criticism from those who believe that zazen must entail a strict and specific means of sitting, as opposed to a cultivated state of mind available at any moment in any situation. Typical of these is Kapleau's claim that Watts dismissed zazen on the basis of only half a koan.

In regard to the aforementioned koan, Robert Baker Aitken reports that Suzuki told him, "I regret to say that Mr. Watts did not understand that story." In his talks, Watts addressed the issue of defining zazen practice by saying, "A cat sits until it is tired of sitting, then gets up, stretches, and walks away", and referring to Zen master Bankei: "Even when you're sitting in meditation, if there's something you've got to do, it's quite all right to get up and leave".

However, Watts did have his supporters in the Zen community, including Shunryu Suzuki, the founder of the San Francisco Zen Center. As David Chadwick recounted in his biography of Suzuki, Crooked Cucumber: the Life and Zen Teaching of Shunryu Suzuki, when a student of Suzuki's disparaged Watts by saying "we used to think he was profound until we found the real thing", Suzuki fumed with a sudden intensity, saying, "You completely miss the point about Alan Watts! You should notice what he has done. He is a great bodhisattva."

Watts's biographers saw him, after his stint as an Anglican priest, as representative of no religion but as a lone-wolf thinker and social rascal. In David Stuart's biography, Watts is seen as an unusually gifted speaker and writer driven by his own interests, enthusiasms, and demons. Elsa Gidlow, whom Watts called "sister", refused to be interviewed for this work but later painted a kinder picture of Watts's life in her own autobiography, Elsa, I Come with My Songs. According to critic Erik Davis, his "writings and recorded talks still shimmer with a profound and galvanizing lucidity."

Unabashed, Watts was not averse to acknowledging his rascal nature, referring to himself in his autobiography In My Own Way as "a sedentary and contemplative character, an intellectual, a Brahmin, a mystic and also somewhat of a disreputable epicurean who has three wives, seven children and five grandchildren".

Personal life

Watts married three times and had seven children (five daughters and two sons).  He met Eleanor Everett in 1936, when her mother, Ruth Fuller Everett, brought her to London to study piano. They met at the Buddhist Lodge, were engaged the following year and married in April 1938. A daughter, Joan, was born in November 1938 and another, Anne, was born in 1942. Their marriage ended in 1949, but Watts continued to correspond with his former mother-in-law.

In 1950, Watts married Dorothy DeWitt. He moved to San Francisco in early 1951 to teach. They began a family that grew to include five children: Tia, Mark, Richard, Lila, and Diane. The couple separated in the early 1960s after Watts met Mary Jane Yates King (called "Jano" in his circle) while lecturing in New York.

After a difficult divorce, he married King in 1964. The couple divided their time between Sausalito, California, where they lived on a houseboat called the Vallejo, and a secluded cabin in Druid Heights, on the southwest flank of Mount Tamalpais north of San Francisco. King died in 1993.

He also maintained relations with Jean Burden, his lover and the inspiration/editor of Nature, Man and Woman.

Watts was a heavy smoker throughout his life and in his later years drank heavily.

In popular culture 
 His quote "We think of time as a one-way motion," from his lecture Time & The More It Changes appears at the beginning of the season 1 finale of the Loki TV show along with quotes from Neil Armstrong, Greta Thunberg, Malala Yousafzai, Nelson Mandela, Ellen Johnson Sirleaf, and Maya Angelou
 Several songs by the American indie rock band STRFKR sample audio from Watts' lectures
 The 2013 Spike Jonze movie Her, set in the near future, includes an AI based on Watts
 An audio clip from "Out of Your Mind: The Nature of Consciousness" is used in the Volume 3 trailer for the Netflix adult animated anthology series, Love, Death & Robots
 Watts was sampled in the songs Rivers Between Us by Draconian, Overthinker by INZO,  Forget the Money by Nick Bateman, and Memento Mori by Architects.
 The 2017 video game Everything contains quotes from Watts' lectures. (The creator previously worked on Her, which also referenced Watts)
 Watts is sampled in Dreams, a 2019 cinema and television advertisement for the cruise liner Cunard
 Watts is also sampled in "Words in Motion", a short animation created for a Carnegie Mellon University design course on Time, Motion, and Communication

Works

Note: ISBN's for titles originally published prior to 1974 are for reprint editions.
 1932 An Outline of Zen Buddhism, The Golden Vista Press (32-page pamphlet)
 1936 The Spirit of Zen: A Way of Life, Work and Art in the Far East, E.P. Dutton 
 1937 The Legacy of Asia and Western Man, University of Chicago Press
 1940 The Meaning of Happiness. (reprinted, Harper & Row, 1979)
 1944 Theologia Mystica: Being the Treatise of Saint Dionysius, Pseudo-Areopagite, on Mystical Theology, Together with the First and Fifth Epistles, West Park, New York: Holy Cross Press 
 1947 Behold the Spirit: A Study in the Necessity of Mystical Religion, Pantheon Books, 
 1948 Zen, James Ladd Delkin, Stanford, California
 1950 Easter: Its Story and Meaning New York: Schuman
 1950 The Supreme Identity: An Essay on Oriental Metaphysic and the Christian Religion, Noonday Press/Farrar, Straus & Giroux,  
 1951 
 1953 Myth and Ritual in Christianity, Thames and Hudson, including essay "God and Satan"
 1957 The Way of Zen, Pantheon Books 
 1958 Nature, Man and Woman, Pantheon Books, 
 1959 Beat Zen Square Zen and Zen, San Francisco: City Lights Books, 
 1960 This Is It and Other Essays on Zen and Spiritual Experience, Pantheon Books, 
 1961 Psychotherapy East and West, Pantheon Books, 
 1962 The Joyous Cosmology: Adventures in the Chemistry of Consciousness, Pantheon Books
 1963 The Two Hands of God: The Myths of Polarity, George Braziller
 1964 Beyond Theology: The Art of Godmanship, Pantheon Books, 
 1966 
 1967 Nonsense, illustrations by Greg Irons (a collection of literary nonsense), San Francisco: Stolen Paper Editions 
 1970 Does It Matter?: Essays on Man's Relation to Materiality, Pantheon Books, 
 1971 The Temple of Konarak: Erotic Spirituality, with photographs by Eliot Elisofon, London: Thames and Hudson. Also published as Erotic Spirituality: The Vision of Konarak, New York: Macmillan
 1972 The Art of Contemplation: A Facsimile Manuscript with Doodles, Pantheon Books
 , Vintage Books pocket edition 1973, New World Library edition, 2007, 
 1973 Cloud-hidden, Whereabouts Unknown: A Mountain Journal, Pantheon Books. Also published in Canada in 1974 by Jonathan Cape,

Posthumous publications
 1974 The Essence of Alan Watts, ed. Mary Jane Watts, Celestial Arts
 1975 Tao: The Watercourse Way, with Chungliang Al Huang, Pantheon
 1976 Essential Alan Watts, ed. Mark Watts,
 1978 Uncarved Block, Unbleached Silk: The Mystery of Life
 1979 Om: Creative Meditations, ed. Mark Watts
 1982 Play to Live, ed. Mark Watts
 1983 Way of Liberation: Essays and Lectures on the Transformation of the Self, ed. Mark Watts
 1985 Out of the Trap, ed. Mark Watts
 1986 Diamond Web, ed. Mark Watts
 1987 The Early Writings of Alan Watts, ed. John Snelling, Dennis T. Sibley, and Mark Watts
 1990 The Modern Mystic: A New Collection of the Early Writings of Alan Watts, ed. John Snelling and Mark Watts
 1994 Talking Zen, ed. Mark Watts
 1995 Become What You Are, Shambhala, expanded ed. 2003. 
 1995 Buddhism: The Religion of No-Religion, ed. Mark Watts A preview from Google Books
 1995 The Philosophies of Asia, ed. Mark Watts
 1995 The Tao of Philosophy, ed. Mark Watts, edited transcripts, Tuttle Publishing, 1999. 
 1996 Myth and Religion, ed. Mark Watts
 1997 Taoism: Way Beyond Seeking, ed. Mark Watts
 1997 Zen and the Beat Way, ed. Mark Watts
 1998 Culture of Counterculture, ed. Mark Watts
 1999 Buddhism: The Religion of No-Religion, ed. Mark Watts, edited transcripts, Tuttle Publishing. 
 2000 Eastern Wisdom, ed. Mark Watts, MJF Books. , three books in one volume: What is Zen?, What is Tao?, and An Introduction to Meditation (Still the Mind). Assembled from transcriptions of audio tape recordings made by his son Mark, of lectures and seminars given by Alan Watts during the last decade of his life.
 2000 Still the Mind: An Introduction to Meditation, ed. Mark Watts, New World Library. 
 2000 What Is Tao?, ed. Mark Watts, New World Library. 
 2000 What Is Zen?, ed. Mark Watts, New World Library.  A preview from Google Books
 2002 Zen, the Supreme Experience: The Newly Discovered Scripts, ed. Mark Watts, Vega
 2006 Eastern Wisdom, Modern Life: Collected Talks, 1960–1969, New World Library
 2017 Collected Letters of Alan Watts, Ed. Joan Watts & Anne Watts, New World Library.

Audio and video works, essays
Including recordings of lectures at major universities and multi-session seminars.
 1960 Eastern Wisdom and Modern Life, television series, Season 1 (1959) and Season 2 (1960)
 1960 Essential Lectures
 1960 From Time to Eternity
 1960 Lecture on Zen
 1960 Nature of Consciousness (here)
 1960 Taoism
 1960 The Cross of Cards
 1960 The Value of Psychotic Experience
 1960 The World As Emptiness
 1962 Haiku (Long playing album - MEA LP 1001)
 1962 This Is It - Alan Watts and friends in a spontaneous musical happening (Long playing album - MEA LP 1007)
 1968 Psychedelics & Religious Experience, in California Law Review (here)
 1969 Why Not Now: The Art of Meditation
 1971 Alan Watts on Living, 5-part television miniseries produced in Vancouver by CBC Television, concerning his views on the detrimental nature of culture.
 1972 The Art of Contemplation, Village Press
 1972 The Way of Liberation in Zen Buddhism, Alan Watts Journal, vol. 2, nr 1
 1972: Radio interview. Alan reads from his auto biography "In My Own Way" and discusses his life and philosophy with Lex Hixon; host of  “In the Spirit” on WBAI Radio.
 1994 Zen: The Best of Alan Watts (VHS)
 1998 Summer Of Love: The Spirituality And Consciousness Of The 1960s (Cassette)
 2004 Out of Your Mind: Essential Listening from the Alan Watts Audio Archives, Sounds True, Inc. Unabridged edition,
 2005 Do You Do It, or Does It Do You?: How to let the universe meditate you (CD)
 2007 Zen Meditations with Alan Watts, DVD (here)
 2013 What If Money Was No Object? (3 minutes) on YouTube
 2015 Thusness (CD)
 2016 "You Are The Universe" Youtube
 2019 PY1 Multimedia Show py1.co
 2021 'Delta Goodrem' 'PLAY'  Bridge Over Troubled Dreams
 2022 'The Art of Meditation' , Sigur Ros & Formless
 2022 'Accepted Too' , 
Akira The Don

Biographical publications
 Furlong, Monica (1986). Genuine Fake: A Biography of Alan Watts. Heinemann (or titled Zen Effects: The Life of Alan Watts as published by Houghton Mifflin Company, Boston).
 Lhermite, Pierre (1983) Alan Watts, Taoïste d'Occident, éd. La Table Ronde.
 Stuart, David (pseudonym for Edwin Palmer Hoyt Jr.)(1976). Alan Watts: The Rise and Decline of the Ordained Shaman of the Counterculture. Chilton Book Co., Pa.

References

Bibliography
 Aitken, Robert. Original Dwelling Place. Counterpoint. Washington, D.C. 1997.  (paperback)
 Charters, Ann (ed.). The Portable Beat Reader. Penguin Books. New York. 1992.  (hardcover);  (paperback).
 Furlong, Monica, Zen Effects: The Life of Alan Watts. Houghton Mifflin. New York. 1986 , Skylight Paths 2001 edition of the biography, with new foreword by author: .
 Gidlow, Elsa, Elsa: I Come with My Songs. Bootlegger Press and Druid Heights Books, San Francisco. 1986. .
 Kapleau, Philip. Three Pillars of Zen (1967) Beacon Press. .
 Stirling, Isabel. Zen Pioneer: The Life & Works of Ruth Fuller Sasaki, Shoemaker & Hoard. 2006. .
 Van Morrison "Alan Watts Blues".  Album: Poetic Champions Compose, 1987
 Watts, Alan, In My Own Way. New York. Random House Pantheon. 1973  (his autobiography).

Further reading
 Clark, David K. The Pantheism of Alan Watts. Downers Grove, Illinois: Inter-Varsity Press. 1978.

External links

 AlanWatts.org official site run by Watts's son Mark through the non-profit setup by Mark and Watts
 Alan Watts Mountain Center north of San Francisco
 Alan Watts on Cuke.com

1915 births
1973 deaths
20th-century American male writers
20th-century American non-fiction writers
20th-century Buddhists
20th-century English male writers
20th-century English non-fiction writers
American Buddhists
American Buddhist spiritual teachers
American Episcopal priests
American male non-fiction writers
American people of English descent
American spiritual teachers
American spiritual writers
American Taoists
Beat Generation writers
British scholars of Buddhism
Buddhism in the United States
Buddhist writers
Converts to Buddhism from Christianity
English Buddhists
English Buddhist spiritual teachers
English emigrants to the United States
English male non-fiction writers
English spiritual teachers
English spiritual writers
English Taoists
Harvard Fellows
Mahayana Buddhists
Metaphysicians
20th-century mystics
Pantheists
People educated at The King's School, Canterbury
People from Chislehurst
British psychedelic drug advocates
Spiritual teachers
Writers from London
Zen in the United States